Eva Sanches Pereira (born 22 March 1989) is a Cape Verdean middle distance runner.

Pereira first competed for Cape Verde at the 2005 World Youth Championships in Athletics in Marrakesh, Morocco where she placed 15th in the Girls' 3000 metres in a personal best time of 11:53.24. Two years later at the 2009 Lusophony Games in Lisbon, Portugal she placed 6th in the 10,000 metres with a time of 44:56. The following month she ran the 1500 metres in 5:04.95 at the 2009 World Championships in Athletics in Berlin.

Personal bests
Below are Eva Pereira's personal best times.

References

1989 births
Living people
Place of birth missing (living people)
Cape Verdean female long-distance runners
World Athletics Championships athletes for Cape Verde
Cape Verdean female middle-distance runners